Bowhunter TV is a television series about the sport of bowhunting which debuted on the Outdoor Channel in 2005. It is made in conjunction with Bowhunter Magazine and now airs on the Sportsman Channel. The show is produced by the Outdoor Sportsman Group and owned by Kroenke Sports & Entertainment.

Contributors 
Bowhunter TV has many contributors, mostly employees of the magazine but sometimes also sponsor guests or friends of the writers.

Hosts include Mike Carney and Curt Wells.

Regular contributors:
 Dwight Schuh
 Brian Fortenbaugh
 Danny Farris
 Terry Lauber
 Larry D. Jones
 Jeff Millar
 Derek Mleynek
 Tony Peterson
 Randy Ulmer
 Jeff Waring
 CJ Winand
 Laden Force

References

External links 
 
 

2005 American television series debuts
American sports television series
English-language television shows
Outdoor Channel original programming